Lynn Marks (15 August 1942 – 7 December 1997) was an Australian cricketer. He played 33 first-class matches for New South Wales and South Australia between 1962/63 and 1968/69.

See also
 List of New South Wales representative cricketers

References

External links
 

1942 births
1997 deaths
Australian cricketers
New South Wales cricketers
South Australia cricketers
Cricketers from Sydney